Ma Jisheng (born 1 March 1957) is a former Chinese diplomat who served as Chinese Ambassador to Iceland between December 2012 and September 2014.

Early life
Ma was born in Hebei province on March 1, 1957.

Career
In 1988 he joined the Department of Asian Affairs, a department of the Ministry of Foreign Affairs. In 1991 he was assigned to the Chinese Embassy in Japan. He returned to China in 1995. In 2002 he was a counsellor at the Embassy of the People's Republic of China in the Republic of Indonesia. In 2004 he became counsellor and minister-counsellor at the  Chinese Embassy in Japan. In 2008 he was promoted to become deputy director of the Information Department of the Ministry of Foreign Affairs. In 2012 he was appointed Chinese Ambassador to Iceland, succeeding .

On January 8, 2014, Ma criticized the then Japanese Prime Minister Shinzo Abe for visiting the Yasukuni Shrine. In September 2014 he was arrested by the Ministry of State Security of the People's Republic of China for leaking state secrets to Japan.

Personal life
Ma is married and has a daughter.

References

1957 births
Living people
Ambassadors of China to Iceland
Diplomats of the People's Republic of China